The Fondo Ambiente Italiano (FAI) is the National Trust of Italy.

The organisation was established in 1975 as the Fondo Ambiente Italiano, based on the model of the National Trust of England, Wales, & Northern Ireland. It is a private non-profit organisation and has over 190,000 members as of 2018. Its purpose is to protect elements of Italy's physical heritage which might otherwise be lost.

History 
The foundation goes back to the initiative of Elena Croce, the daughter of the Italian philosopher Benedetto Croce. Elena Croce wanted to apply the UK National Trust for Places of Historic Interest or Natural Beauty model to Italy. Giulia Maria Mozzoni Crespi, Renato Bazzoni, Alberto Predieri and Franco Russoli sign the founding act of the FAI in 1975. Shortly after its founding, the FAI received its first important foundations and donations.

The first donation was made in 1976 by the lawyer Piero de Blasi. He gave the FAI 1,000 m2 of land on Panarea, one of the Aeolian islands off Sicily, thereby preventing much of the island from being built on and destroyed. In 1977 Emanuela Castelbarco, granddaughter of Arturo Toscanini, donated the medieval Castle of Avio in Trentino to the FAI. The FAI began an extensive restoration of the castle while allowing the Castelbarco family to continue to occupy parts of the castle. However, the FAI alone was responsible for the costs of the restoration, administration and later opening of the castle to the general public. The FAI thus established a new model of monument protection in Italy. Also in 1977, the FAI began restoration work at the Monastery of Torba, Castelseprio, in the northern Italian province of Varese. The monastery was initially purchased at her own expense by the founder of the foundation, Giulia Maria Mozzoni Crespi, and then donated to the FAI to save it from total decay. Today the monastery complex is one of the most important testimonies of the Lombards in Italy and thus a UNESCO World Heritage Site.

Properties 
As of early 2007 the organisation had twenty-two properties including castles, gardens, monastic buildings and other cultural assets. These are spread throughout Italy, but the majority are in the north of the country.

Province of Agrigento
Giardino della Kolymbetra (Valle dei Templi, Agrigento)
Province of Bergamo
Mulino di Baresi (Roncobello)
Province of Como
Villa del Balbianello (Lenno, Lake Como)
Province of Cuneo
Castello della Manta (Manta)
 Province of Genoa
Casa Carbone (Lavagna)
Historic barber's shop (Genoa)
San Fruttuoso abbey (Camogli)
Torre di Punta Pagana (Rapallo)
Province of La Spezia
Villa Rezzola (Lerici)
Province of Lucca
Teatrino di Vetriano (also known as the Teatro Catalani) (Vetriano di Pescaglia)
Province of Mantua
A kiosk in the Liberty style (Mantua)
Province of Messina
Cala Junco (an area of Panarea, one of the Aeolian Islands)
Province of Milan
Casa Necchi Campiglio Milan
Collezione Alighiero de' Micheli (Milan)
Province of Naples
Bay of Ieranto (Massa Lubrense)
Province of Padua
Villa dei Vescovi, Luvigliano, a frazione of Torreglia, in the Euganean Hills)
Province of Rome
Park of the Villa Gregoriana (Tivoli)
Province of Sassari
The Talmone Battery (Italian: Batterie Talmone) a system of military defenses (Palau)
Province of Sondrio
Castel Grumello (Montagna in Valtellina)
Trentino
Castello di Avio (Sabbionara di Avio)
The wildlife sanctuary of Maso Fratton-Valaia (Spormaggiore)
Province of Turin
Castello di Masino (Caravino)
Province of Varese
Torba Monastery (Gornate-Olona)
Torre di Velate (Varese)
Villa Della Porta Bozzolo (Casalzuigno)
Villa Panza (Varese)

References

External links

Official website 

 
1975 establishments in Italy
Nature conservation in Italy
Italy
Tourism in Italy
Cultural organisations based in Italy
Environmental organisations based in Italy
Organizations established in 1975
Historic sites in Italy